George Nozuka (born April 28, 1986) is an American-based Canadian-Japanese R&B singer best known for his single "Talk to Me", which peaked at No. 1 on the MuchMusic music-video countdown in October 2006.

Career
Nozuka released his debut album Believe in 2007 under the mononym George. The album was produced by Perry Alexander, Roy "Royalty" Hamilton, and Anthony M. Jones, and was released by HC Entertainment Group. Three tracks became hits: "Talk to Me" (written and produced by Shaun Myers), "Lie to Me", and "Last Time". Music videos for the songs were directed by RT! and appeared on the charts of Canada's specialized music cable channel MuchMusic.

In 2012, Nozuka released a mixtape titled Love Me. For the mixtape and later works, he began using his full name. In 2013, he released a studio album called Beautiful, along with a music video for the first single from the album, called "Don't Go".

Collaborations

Forgotten Children
Through the Canadian section of Plan, Nozuka was involved in a documentary about restavecs, children working as domestic servants in Haiti. The documentary Forgotten Children: The Story of Haiti's Restavecs, directed by Craig Goodwill, shows the situation of the children through the eyes of various personalities, including Nozuka, a Canadian United Nations peacekeeper, Haitian filmmakers and activists, and former restavecs themselves. Nozuka produced the song "Hurting Child" for the documentary.

Featured with other performers
 "With You Remix" by JDiggz and Drake

Songwriting
Nozuka co-wrote "Home This Christmas" for Justin Bieber, and "I Love Girls" for Cody Simpson.

Personal life
Nozuka is one of seven children of Canadian mother Holly Sedgwick and Japanese father Hiromitsu Nozuka. Sedgwick raised Nozuka and his six siblings as a single mother. Nozuka is the older brother of the musicians Justin Nozuka and Henry Nozuka, and the actor Philip Nozuka.

Nozuka's aunt, his mother's half-sister, is the actress Kyra Sedgwick, who is married to the actor Kevin Bacon.  Their two children, Travis and Sosie Bacon, are Nozuka's first cousins.

Discography

Albums

Mixtapes
2012: Love Me
2016: Purple Kush

EPs
2018: Getaway

Compilations
2015: You Deserve Better
2021: Till The Morning

Singles
2006: "Talk to Me"
2007: "Lie to Me"
2007: "Last Time"
2012: "Don't Go"
2013: "I'm Reaching Out"
2014: "You Deserve Better"
2017: "My Beating Heart"
2018: "Getaway"
2018: "Touch Yourself"
2020: "What You Got"
2020: "Love You Like"

Awards
In 2007, the music video for "Lie to Me" won RT! the Best Director award at the Much Music Video Awards for the second consecutive year.

References

External links 
 YouTube channel
 

1986 births
Living people
Canadian male singers
Canadian expatriate musicians in the United States
Canadian musicians of Japanese descent
Canadian contemporary R&B singers
Musicians from Toronto
St. Andrew's College (Aurora) alumni
Sedgwick family
Canadian soul singers